Bunyola is a municipality of the island of Mallorca, Spain, located in the spurs of the Serra de Tramuntana, at a distance of  from Palma. (INE 2018).

The municipality of Bunyola is located in the Comarca of Serra de Tramuntana, the Tramuntana Range was awarded World Heritage Status by UNESCO as an area of great physical and cultural significance. Bunyola borders with other municipalities of Palma de Mallorca, Marratxí, Santa Maria del Camí, Alaró, Escorca, Sóller, Deià and Valldemossa. Palmayola, Sa Font Seca y Orient are located within the municipality boundaries. 

Celebration day of the patron saint, San Mateo, is on the 21st of September.

The Raixa Estate is located in Bunyola. It is a large Italian style villa surrounded by Pietro Lazzarini-designed gardens, and was used as the filming location for the 1982 film, Evil under the Sun. Once owned by the German designer Jil Sander, it was subsequently purchased by the Island Council of Majorca. It reopened to visitors in late 2018.

References 

Municipalities in Mallorca
Populated places in Mallorca